Brigadier John Mark Lancaster, Baron Lancaster of Kimbolton,  (born 12 May 1970) is a British Conservative Party politician, a Member of the House of Lords and a British Army reserve officer. He previously served as Member of Parliament for North East Milton Keynes from 2005 until 2010, and then its successor seat Milton Keynes North from the seat's creation at the 2010 general election until his retirement from the House of Commons at the 2019 general election. 

He served as a Minister in several appointments after the formation of the Coalition Government in 2010, first as Lord Commissioner of Her Majesty's Treasury, before in May 2015 moving to the Ministry of Defence, first as the Parliamentary Under Secretary of State for Veterans, Reserves and Personnel, and then, from 13 June 2017, as Minister of State for the Armed Forces. He served in this role until his retirement from Government on 16 December 2019. He was granted a life peerage in the 2019 Dissolution Honours, and was created Baron Lancaster of Kimbolton on 16 September 2020. He was introduced to the House of Lords on 12 October 2020.

Early life
Lancaster was born on 12 May 1970 in Cambridge. He was privately educated at Kimbolton School in Huntingdonshire where his father Ronald Lancaster was chaplain from 1963–88. He graduated as a BSc in Business Studies from the University of Buckingham in 1992 and MBA from the University of Exeter Business School in 1993.  

He was a company director for the family firm Kimbolton Fireworks before he was elected to Parliament.

Political career

Lancaster served on Huntingdonshire District Council between 1995 and 1999.

Lancaster stood unsuccessfully as the Conservative candidate for Nuneaton at the 2001 general election. He was defeated by the Labour incumbent Bill Olner.

House of Commons
Lancaster was elected as Member of Parliament gaining North East Milton Keynes for the Conservatives in the 2005 general election, and succeeding Brian White of the Labour Party.

Between 2005 and 2010 he served in Opposition, first as an Opposition Whip in 2006–2007, before moving to be the Shadow Minister for International Development in 2007 until the 2010 General Election.

During his time as a backbench MP, He served on the Office of Deputy Prime Minister Select Committee, (2005), Defence Select Committee (2006), Housing, Communities and Local Government Committee (2008–09) and the International Development Select Committee (2009–10).

After his re-election in 2010 and the formation of the Coalition Government, he was initially appointed as the PPS to the Secretary of State for International Development, From 2012 to 2015, he was a government whip and a Lord Commissioner of the Treasury. He then moved to the Ministry of Defence where he was Parliamentary Under-Secretary of State for Defence Veterans, Reserves and Personnel (2015–2017) and Minister for the Armed Forces (2017–2019).

In November 2019, he announced his retirement from the House of Commons.

House of Lords
Lancaster was nominated for a peerage in the 2019 Dissolution Honours.  On 16 September 2020, he was created Baron Lancaster of Kimbolton by Queen Elizabeth II. He was Introduced to the House of Lords on 12 October 2020, and sits in the House as a Conservative Party life peer. He made his maiden speech on 27 October 2020, while expressing regret that as a bomb disposal expert and with his family ties to fireworks making, that it didn't occur on 5 November.

He was appointed as a member of the NATO Parliamentary Assembly on 9 November 2021.

Political views

Lancaster has stated his disagreement with the UK Government's policy on the 2003 invasion of Iraq. In an interview with the BBC, he stated "It may well be much harder to get the British public to back other overseas adventures by the military because of what's happened in Iraq". Lancaster voted against legislation allowing gay couples to marry at the Bill's second reading, but supported minor 'tidying up' legislation supporting the principle once the main Bill had passed through the House of Commons. He later tweeted in July 2016 that he had been wrong to have opposed the second reading.

In 2011 Lancaster introduced his own private member's bill, which enabled special Olympic 1 kg gold and silver coins to be struck by the Royal Mint as part of the 2012 Olympic legacy. In 2013 Lancaster was successful in his four-year campaign to get Khat classified as a category C drug following calls from his constituents.

Military career

Lancaster was commissioned a second lieutenant in the Corps of Royal Engineers on 4 December 1988, holding a Short-Service Limited Commission (SSLC). Between 1988 and 1990 Lancaster served in the British Army on an extended SSLC in Hong Kong with the Queen's Gurkha Engineers before going to university.  On 1 March 1990, he transferred his commission to the Army Reserve and was promoted lieutenant on 1 July 1991. He was promoted captain on 1 June 1997 (seniority from 16 October 1995), with promotion to major on 13 May 2004 (seniority from 1 March 2002).

Lancaster has been on active service three times, in Kosovo (1999–2000), Bosnia (2001–2002) and Afghanistan (2006). He continues to serve in the General Staff Corps (late Royal Engineers), having previously commanded an Explosive Ordnance Disposal unit. 

Lancaster was promoted to lieutenant-colonel on 1 February 2012 and to colonel on 22 June 2017. He was Deputy Commander of 77th Brigade from June 2018 to July 2020. and was appointed Chair of the Reserve Forces 2030 review in January 2020. 

He was promoted to brigadier on 1 August 2020. and currently serves as Deputy Director Joint Warfare at UK's Strategic Command. 

He was appointed as the Deputy Colonel Commandant Brigade of Gurkhas on 1 September 2019, and Honorary Colonel of the Cayman Islands Regiment on 2 July 2021. 

He received the Territorial Decoration (TD) in 2002 and the Volunteer Reserves Service Medal (VRSM) in 2011. He was awarded a bar to the VRSM for a further five years service in 2016 and a second bar for a further five years service in 2021.

Personal life
Lancaster lives in Gosport with his wife, Conservative MP for Gosport Caroline Dinenage. He previously married Katherine Reader 1995 before separating in 2006 and divorcing in 2009. He briefly partnered Amanda Evans with whom he has a daughter. In February 2014, he married Caroline Dinenage, who had also been previously married. Lancaster is a supporter of MK Dons, and enjoys playing cricket, which includes the House of Commons team.

He was awarded an honorary doctorate from the University of Buckingham in 2008.

Honours

References

External links
 Personal website of Mark Lancaster MP
 
 National Conservative Party profile on Mark Lancaster
 Milton Keynes Conservative Association website

1970 births
Living people
People from Cambridge
Alumni of the University of Exeter
Alumni of the University of Buckingham
Royal Engineers officers
Conservative Party (UK) MPs for English constituencies
Conservative Party (UK) life peers
UK MPs 2005–2010
UK MPs 2010–2015
UK MPs 2015–2017
UK MPs 2017–2019
Politics of Milton Keynes
People educated at Kimbolton School
Bomb disposal personnel
British Army personnel of the War in Afghanistan (2001–2021)
Members of the Privy Council of the United Kingdom
Life peers created by Elizabeth II
Spouses of British politicians